Professor Michael Ian Bruce DSc FAA (1938-), born and educated in England, became Professor of Physical and Inorganic Chemistry at the University of Adelaide in 1973, and was the Angas Professor of Chemistry at the University of Adelaide from 1982 until his retirement in 2009.

Scholarship
Bruce made many contributions to the chemistry of metal clusters, particularly those of ruthenium.

Recognition
He was elected a Fellow of the Australian Academy of Science in 1989 and was awarded the David Craig Medal and Lecture in 2003.

References

Australian chemists
Academic staff of the University of Adelaide
1938 births
Living people
Fellows of the Australian Academy of Science